Anita Pinczi (born 14 November 1993) is a Hungarian footballer who plays as a defender for Női NB I club Győri ETO FC and the Hungary women's national team.

References

1993 births
Living people
Women's association football defenders
Hungarian women's footballers
Hungary women's international footballers
MTK Hungária FC (women) players
Hungarian expatriate footballers
Hungarian expatriate sportspeople in Romania
Expatriate women's footballers in Romania
Hungarian women's futsal players
FCU Olimpia Cluj players